The Peace Arch News is a bi-weekly newspaper founded in 1976 that serves the White Rock / South Surrey area.

It has been a part of the Black Press Group since January 1997. The related but separate Peace Arch News Daily was shuttered in 2014.

See also
List of newspapers in Canada

References

External links
Peace Arch News
Black Press Group Ltd.

1976 establishments in British Columbia
Black Press
Surrey, British Columbia
Newspapers published in British Columbia
Publications established in 1976
White Rock, British Columbia
Biweekly newspapers published in Canada